Alice Ramsey or Ramsay may refer to:

 Alicia Ramsey (1864–1933), British writer often known as Alice Ramsey
 Alice Huyler Ramsey (1886–1983), first woman to drive an automobile across America
 Alice Ramsay, musician on the album Tow Truck